Brahma Vishnu Maheshwara is a 1988 Indian Kannada-language action drama film, written and directed by Rajachandra and produced by Rohini Pictures. The film had an ensemble cast including Ambareesh, Ananth Nag, V. Ravichandran, Thulasi, Kiran Juneja and Mahalakshmi, while many other prominent actors featured in supporting roles. The soundtrack and score composition were by Vijayanand, and the lyrics along with the dialogues were written by Chi. Udaya Shankar. The film was a remake of 1977 Tamil film Chakravarthy which was also remade in Telugu as Mugguru Mithrulu (1985) and in Hindi as Dosti Dushmani (1986).

Cast 

 Ananth Nag as Inspector Mahesh
 Ambareesh as Doctor Brahmendra
 V. Ravichandran as Lawyer Narayan
 Mahalakshmi
 Kiran Juneja
 Thulasi 
 K. S. Ashwath
 Pandari Bai
 Mukhyamantri Chandru
 Doddanna
 Lokanath
 R. N. Sudarshan
 Dingri Nagaraj
 S. Narayan
 Keerthiraj

Soundtrack 
The music was composed by Vijayanand, with lyrics by Chi. Udaya Shankar.

References

External links 
 
 Full movie

1988 films
1980s action drama films
1980s Kannada-language films
Indian action drama films
Kannada remakes of Tamil films
1988 drama films
Films directed by Rajachandra
Films scored by Vijayanand